Mansuè is a comune (municipality) in the Province of Treviso in the Italian region Veneto, located about  northeast of Venice and about  northeast of Treviso.

Mansuè borders the following municipalities: Fontanelle, Gaiarine, Gorgo al Monticano, Oderzo, Pasiano di Pordenone, Portobuffolé, Prata di Pordenone.

References

External links
 Official website

Cities and towns in Veneto